Geoffrey Anketell Studdert Kennedy  (27 June 1883 – 8 March 1929) was an English Anglican priest and poet. He was nicknamed "Woodbine Willie" during World War I for giving Woodbine cigarettes to the soldiers he met, as well as spiritual aid to injured and dying soldiers.

Early life
Born in Leeds, England, on 27 June 1883, Studdert Kennedy was the seventh of nine children born to Jeanette Anketell and William Studdert Kennedy, vicar of St Mary's, Quarry Hill in Leeds. His father William Studdert Kennedy was born in Blackrock, County Dublin, Ireland, in 1826. Geoffrey's paternal grandfather, Robert Mitchell Kennedy,  was Dean of Clonfert in County Galway, Ireland from 1850 until his death in 1864. One of Geoffrey's brothers was Hugh A. Studdert Kennedy, a biographer of American religious leader Mary Baker Eddy.

Because of his Irish forefathers, Geoffrey always maintained he was an Irishman. He was educated at Leeds Grammar School and Trinity College, Dublin, where he gained a degree in classics and divinity in 1904. After a year's training at Ripon Clergy College, he became a curate at St Andrew's Church, Rugby, and then, in 1914, the vicar of St. Paul's, Worcester.

Military career
On the outbreak of World War I, Studdert Kennedy volunteered as a chaplain to the army on the Western Front, where he gained the nickname "Woodbine Willie". In 1917, he was awarded the Military Cross at Messines Ridge after running into no man's land to help the wounded during an attack on the German frontline.

During the war he supported the British military effort with enthusiasm. Attached to a bayonet-training service, chaplain Kennedy toured with boxers and wrestlers to give morale-boosting speeches about the usefulness of the bayonet. One of his inspirational speeches is vividly described by A. S. Bullock as "the most extraordinary talk I ever heard'. Bullock notes that the listeners 'were a very rough, tough lot, but they sat spellbound", and quotes a section of the speech, at the end of which "everybody sprang to their feet and cheered him to the echo".

He wrote a number of poems about his experiences, and these appeared in the books Rough Rhymes of a Padre (1918), and More Rough Rhymes (1919), among others.

An anthology of his works was published under the title The Unutterable Beauty.

Later life
After the war, Studdert Kennedy was given charge of St Edmund, King and Martyr in Lombard Street, London. Having been converted to Christian socialism and pacifism during the war, he wrote Lies (1919), Democracy and the Dog-Collar (1921) (featuring such chapters as "The Church Is Not a Movement but a Mob", "Capitalism is Nothing But Greed, Grab, and Profit-Mongering" and "So-Called Religious Education Worse than Useless"), Food for the Fed Up (1921), The Wicket Gate (1923), and The Word and the Work (1925). He moved to work for the Industrial Christian Fellowship, for whom he went on speaking tours of Britain.

His appointment as missioner for ICF released him from routine clerical duties to become an outspoken advocate for the working classes. One of his celebrated quotes was: "If finding God in our churches leads to us losing Him in our factories, then better we tear down those churches for God must hate the sight of them."

It was on one of these tours that he was taken ill with the flu, which was complicated by his weak lungs. He died in Liverpool on 8 March 1929, exhausted at the age of 45. His funeral took place in Worcester, to which First World War veterans and poor working people flocked to pay their respects. The Dean of Westminster refused burial at Westminster Abbey, because he said Studdert Kennedy was a "socialist", even though he had distrusted most politicians and had refused to join any political party.

Honours and legacy

Honours
Studdert Kennedy was awarded the Military Cross (MC) during World War I. His citation read:

The Museum of Army Chaplaincy at Amport House, Hampshire, also honours Kennedy with a large display about his life. In February 2013, John Packer, Bishop of Ripon and Leeds unveiled a commemorative plaque in Ripon, North Yorkshire, to honour the Ripon Clergy College and Studdert Kennedy.

Studdert Kennedy is commemorated with a feast day (Commemoration) on the liturgical calendar of the Church of England on 8 March.

Legacy
He wrote the poem Roses in December, which J.M. Barrie quoted in his rectorial address to the University of St. Andrews entitled Courage in 1922, and often misattributed to Barrie.

War! Lies! And a Packet of Fags! is a play by David Gooderson about the Great War and its aftermath—the story of "Woodbine Willie". The play is based on extensive research into the life of Studdert Kennedy, including meetings with members of his family, and a detailed study of the background of the period.

He is mentioned in the Divine Comedy song "Absent Friends": "Woodbine Willie couldn't rest until he'd/given every bloke a final smoke/before the killing," and in Finnegans Wake by Irish author James Joyce: "tsingirillies' zyngarettes, while Woodbine Willie, so popiular with the poppyrossies" (351).

Venerable Archbishop Fulton J. Sheen quoted Studdert Kennedy's 1918 poem "Indifference" (from the collection called "Rough Rhymes of a Padre") when Sheen spoke publicly about the need for enthusiasm in all of one's life. Studdert Kennedy "wrote this poem during what was called ‘the great disillusion’ of the 1920s". Sheen's point was that the "world is suffering from indifference" as "apathy, not caring." Sheen noted that he wondered if Jesus Christ "did not suffer more from our indifference than he did from the crucifixion." To make his point he recited Studdert Kennedy's poem "Indifference."

His son was the psychologist and linguist Michael Studdert-Kennedy.

Works
Poetry

 1918: Rough Rhymes of a Padre: by "Woodbine Willie". London: Hodder and Stoughton
 1919: More Rough Rhymes of a Padre. London: Hodder and Stoughton
 1920: Peace Rhymes of a Padre. London: Hodder and Stoughton
 1922: Songs of Faith and Doubt. London: Hodder and Stoughton
 1924: The Sorrows of God and Other Poems (anthology) R.R. Smith, New York
 1925: Lighten Our Darkness: Some Less Rough Rhymes of a Padre
 1927: The Unutterable Beauty: the collected poetry of G. A. Studdert Kennedy (anthology). London: Hodder and Stoughton
 1928: I Believe: Sermons on the Apostle's Creed First published as Food for the Fed-up (London: Hodder and Stoughton, 1921).
 1929: Rhymes. [A selection from "Rough Rhymes. "More Rough Rhymes" and "Peace Rhymes."] (anthology). London: Hodder and Stoughtonn

Books

 1918: Rough Talks by a Padre delivered to officers and men of the B.E.F. London: Hodder and Stoughton
 1918: The Hardest Part. London: Hodder and Stoughton
 1918: God and the Sacrament: a reprint of a chapter of the author's book entitled The Hardest Part. London: Hodder and Stoughton
 1919: Aren't All the Best Chaps Christians?] London: Hodder and Stoughton
 1919: Lies. London: Hodder and Stoughton
 1921: Democracy and the Dog Collar. London: Hodder and Stoughton
 1921: Food for the Fed Up (US I Believe; sermons on the Apostles' creed). London: Hodder and Stoughton
 1923: [https://babel.hathitrust.org/cgi/pt?id=uc1.$b689939&view=1up&seq=9 The Wicket Gate: or plain bread. London: Hodder and Stoughton
 1926: The Word and the Work. London: Longmans
 1927 I Pronounce Them: a story of man and wife – a novel. New York: George H Doran
 1928: The Warrior the Woman and the Christ: a study of the leadership of Christ. London: Wyman and Sons
 1928: Environment. E. Benn (32 pages)
 1932: The New Man in Christ. London: Hodder and Stoughton
 1932: When We Pray: a method of prayer taught by G.A. Studdert Kennedy. Hodder and Stoughton. Written by Ronald Sinclair
 193?: Meaning of the Real Presence. (5 pages reprinted from) The Witness, NY

Anthologies

 1947: The best of G.A. Studdert-Kennedy (Woodbine Willy) : selected from his writings by a friend. Hodder and Stoughton
 2008: After War, Is Faith Possible? By Geoffrey Studdert Kennedy & Kerry Walters (editor). Lutterworth Press

References

Further reading
 "Geoffrey Studdert Kennedy: The Pastor and the Suffering God" . An OCMS lecture about Geoffrey Studdert Kennedy, given by Robert Ellis, 2005 February 15.
Holman, Annette, Woodbine Willy: an unsung hero of World War One, Lion Hudson 2013
 
Purcell, William, Woodbine Willy: a study of Geoffrey Studdert Kennedy (an Anglican incident. Being an account of the life and times of Geoffrey Anketell Studdert Kennedy poet, profit, seeker after truth, 1883 – 1929, Mowbray 1962
 Turtle Bunbury, The Glorious Madness, Tales of The Irish and The Great War'',  Woodbine Willie - The Soldiers' Poet, pp. 82–91, Gill & Macmillan, Dublin 12 (2014) 
Nix, Dayne Edward, "Moral Injury and a First World War Chaplain: The Life of G.A. Studdert Kennedy. Lexington Books, 2021.

External links
 

1883 births
1929 deaths
20th-century English male writers
20th-century English Anglican priests
20th-century English poets
Alumni of Trinity College Dublin
Anglican pacifists
Anglican poets
Anglican saints
Anglican socialists
British Army personnel of World War I
English Christian pacifists
English Christian socialists
English male poets
English World War I poets
People educated at Leeds Grammar School
Clergy from Leeds
Recipients of the Military Cross
Royal Army Chaplains' Department officers
World War I chaplains
Military personnel from Leeds